Loran F. Nordgren is an American professor of psychology who studies the adoption of new ideas and behaviors. In 2020 he became a professor at Northwestern University's Kellogg School of Management. He is the co-author of The Human Element: Overcoming the Resistance That Awaits New Ideas.

Nordgren completed a B.A. in psychology, magna cum laude, in 2001 at St. Olaf College. He was a Fulbright scholar and completed a Ph.D. in social psychology with distinction at the University of Amsterdam. He was recognized as one of Poets & Quants’ 40 under 40 business school professors. Nordgren is the founder of Candor, a software company that promotes bias-free collaboration and feedback. In 2009, he was a social and experimental psychologist and assistant professor at Northwestern's Kellogg School of Management.

Nordren received the Theoretical Innovation Award of the Society of Personality and Social Psychology and the De Finnetti Prize from the European Association for Decision Making.

Selected publications

References

External links 

Living people
Kellogg School of Management faculty
American psychology writers
Year of birth missing (living people)
21st-century American psychologists
Organizational psychologists
21st-century American male writers
21st-century American non-fiction writers
American social psychologists
Experimental psychologists
St. Olaf College alumni
University of Amsterdam alumni